Extensions is the fifth studio album by The Manhattan Transfer, released on October 31, 1979, by Atlantic Records.

Marking a new era for the group, the album was the first one with Cheryl Bentyne, who replaced Laurel Massé in early 1979. It was also their first album with Jay Graydon in the producer's chair and their first to contain songs that were hits in both the jazz and pop categories. The song "Twilight Zone/Twilight Tone" reached No. 4 on the Billboard Disco chart and No. 30 on the Hot 100. "Trickle, Trickle" reached No. 73 on the Hot 100. The album reached No. 55 on the Billboard Top LPs chart.

The most widely known song from this album, "Birdland" by Weather Report, won the Grammy Award for Best Jazz Fusion Performance in 1981.  Jon Hendricks wrote lyrics for the vocalese version on the album and Janis Siegel received a Grammy for her vocal arrangement of "Birdland".

Charts
Extensions debuted on Billboard's Top Pop Album chart on December 8, 1979.

Track listing

Personnel 

The Manhattan Transfer
 Cheryl Bentyne – vocals, arrangements (7)
 Tim Hauser – vocals, arrangements (4, 7, 8), vocal arrangement (8)
 Alan Paul – vocals, arrangements (6, 7)
 Janis Siegel – vocals, vocal arrangement (1, 2, 8), arrangements (7, 8)

Musicians
 Michael Omartian – acoustic piano (1, 7), rhythm arrangements (1)
 Michael Boddicker – synthesizers (1, 4, 6), synthesizer programming (2), vocoder (4)
 Greg Mathieson – synthesizers (2), bass (2), rhythm arrangements (2, 8), synth solo (3), arrangements (4), acoustic piano (8), Fender Rhodes (8)
 David Foster – acoustic piano (3), synthesizers (3), arrangements (3)
 Ian Underwood – synthesizers (3)
 Jay Graydon – vocal arrangements (2), synthesizers (3), guitar (3, 6, 7), arrangements (3, 6, 7), muted guitars (6), guitar solo (6), additional vocals (6), gut-string guitar (8), synthesizer programming (8)
 Bill Mays – acoustic piano (5)
 Jai Winding – acoustic piano (6)
 Jimmy Wyble – rhythm guitar (2)
 Steve Lukather – rhythm guitar (6)
 Dean Parks – guitar (7), electric guitar (8)
 David Hungate – bass (1, 2, 3, 6)
 Chuck Domanico – bass (5)
 Abraham Laboriel – bass (7)
 Andy Muson – bass (8)
 Ralph Humphrey – drums (1, 2, 3, 5, 7)
 Jeff Porcaro – drums (1, 6), anvil (6), bongos (6) 
 Alex Acuña – drums (8)
 Paulinho da Costa – congas (7), percussion (8)
 Richie Cole – alto saxophone (1), alto sax solo (8)
 Don Roberts – piccolo flute (6), tenor sax solo (7)
 Phil Mattson – arrangements (5)
 Gene Puerling – arrangements (9)
 Clare Fischer – conductor (9)

Production 
 Producer, Mixing and Overdub Tracking – Jay Graydon
 Basic Tracks recorded by Joseph Bogan and Bill Thomas.
 Basic Tracks recorded at Dawnbreaker Studios (San Fernando, CA).
 Overdubs and Mixing at Garden Rake Studios (Studio City, CA).
 Mastered by Bernie Grundman at A&M Studios (Hollywood, CA).
 Musical Contractor – Frank DeCaro 
 Art Direction and Design – Tako Ono
 Front Cover Illustration – Pater Sato
 Back Cover Photo – Matthew Rolston
 Costume Design – Jean-Paul Gaultier
 Hair – Pascal
 Make-Up – Koelle

References

The Manhattan Transfer albums
1979 albums